Eremophila resinosa, also known as resinous eremophila, is a flowering plant in the figwort family, Scrophulariaceae and is endemic to Western Australia. It is a spreading shrub with sticky young foliage, short leaves, small sepals and mauve, purple or sometimes white flowers.

Description
The branches have small, raised, amber-coloured, translucent lumps and a covering of fine, branched hairs. The leaves are lance-shaped to egg-shaped with the narrower end towards the base.

They are mauve, purple or sometimes white and when coloured, appear lighter on the outside because of a covering of fine, branched hairs. The inside of the tube is often spotted. The inside surface of the petal lobes is glabrous but the inside of the tube is filled with long hairs. The 4 stamens are fully enclosed in the petal tube.

Taxonomy and naming 
The species was first formally described in 1838 by Stephan Endlicher who gave it the name Pholidia resinosa. The description was published in Stirpium Australasicarum Herbarii Hugeliani Decades Tres. In 1860, Ferdinand von Mueller changed the name to Eremophila resinosa and published the change in Papers and Proceedings of the Royal Society of Van Diemen's Land. The specific epithet (resinosa) is a Latin word meaning "full of resin" or "gummy".

Distribution and habitat
Resinous eremophila grows in clay, gravelly and sandy soils in the wheatbelt north-east of Merredin in the Avon Wheatbelt biogeographic region.

Conservation
Eremophila resinosa is listed as "Endangered" (EN) under the Environment Protection and Biodiversity Conservation Act 1999 (EPBC Act). As at April, 2008 it was only known from 26 natural populations and 1418 individual plants. Five clones of the species were grown by tissue culture and planted at Westonia in 2004. Seed was also collected and grown at the same site. Survival rates are high for both the tissue cultured and seed-raised plants. To date, over 4,000 plants are growing and 2 million fruits are in long-term storage.

Use in horticulture
This small shrub can bear masses of purple flowers in spring and its hardiness adds to its potential as a feature plant in a small garden. It is easily propagated from cuttings and grown in a wide range of soils, including clay in full or part shade. It is very drought tolerant, needing little or no watering, even during long droughts and tolerates the most severe frosts.

References

Eudicots of Western Australia
resinosa
Endemic flora of Western Australia
Rare flora of Australia
Plants described in 1859
Taxa named by Stephan Endlicher